Chui Ka is one of the 38 constituencies in the Sha Tin District in Hong Kong.

The constituency returns one district councillor to the Sha Tin District Council, with an election every four years.

Initially created as Sun Chui in 1991, the current Chui Ka constituency is loosely based on Sun Chui Estate and the area around the Tai Wai station, with an estimated population of 18,417.

Councillors represented

Election results

2010s

2000s

1990s

References

Tai Wai
Constituencies of Hong Kong
Constituencies of Sha Tin District Council
1991 establishments in Hong Kong
Constituencies established in 1991